The canton of Villers-Semeuse is an administrative division of the Ardennes department, northern France. Its borders were modified at the French canton reorganisation which came into effect in March 2015. Its seat is in Villers-Semeuse.

It consists of the following communes:

Aiglemont
Gernelle
Gespunsart
La Grandville
Issancourt-et-Rumel
Lumes
Neufmanil
Saint-Laurent
Villers-Semeuse
Ville-sur-Lumes
Vivier-au-Court

References

Cantons of Ardennes (department)